High School Musical 2: Non-Stop Dance Party is a remixed album of the soundtrack, High School Musical 2. It was released first in the UK and Southeast Asia on December 24, 2007. The entire album was available to listen to on Disney X D UK from December 21 to December 23, a day before the album was released. All of the tracks were remixed by Jason Nevins. Music videos have been released on Disney Channel for "Bet on It" and "Fabulous". Although many fans have stated that the back cover's track listing is incorrect, this is not true. In fact, it only states songs included on the album. Thus, there is no real track listing to be found.

Track listing

Note: All songs remixed by Jason Nevins

iTunes bonus video Version
Bonus tracks

Bonus features
 Slideshow
 Printable Party Invitations

Chart performance
The album debuted at number 68 on the U.S. Billboard 200 chart, selling about 22,000 copies in its first week and sold 25,000 copies in Brazil.

Weekly charts

Year-end charts

References

Disney film soundtracks
High School Musical albums
2007 remix albums
2007 soundtrack albums
Walt Disney Records remix albums
Walt Disney Records soundtracks
Cast recordings